Notable people with the name Sunday include:

Surname
Billy Sunday (1862–1935), American baseball player and evangelist
Dave Sunday (born 1947), Zambian footballer
David Sunday, Nigerian footballer
Gabriel Sunday (born 1985), American actor
Helen Thompson Sunday (1868–1957), American evangelist
Ibrahim Sunday (born 1950), Ghanaian footballer
Johnson Sunday (born 1981), Nigerian footballer
Obaji Sunday (born 1988), Nigerian footballer
Patrick Sunday (born 1975), Nigerian footballer
Stephen Sunday (born 1988), Nigerian-born Spanish footballer

Given name

Politics
Sunday Afolabi (politician) (born 1931), Nigerian politician
Sunday Awoniyi (1932–2007), Nigerian politician
Sunday Essang (born 1940), Nigerian politician
Sunday Fajinmi (born 1952), Nigerian politician

Sports
Sunday Adebayo (born 1973), Nigerian basketball player
Sunday Bada (1969–2011), Nigerian sprinter
Sunday Chibuike (born 1982), Nigerian footballer
Sunday Chidzambwa (born 1952), Zimbabwean footballer and coach
Sunday Chizoba (born 1989), Nigerian footballer
Sunday Dech (born 1994), South Sudanese-Australian basketball player
Sunday Emmanuel (1978–2004), Nigerian sprinter
Sunday Faleye (born 1998), Nigerian footballer
Sunday Ibrahim (born 1980), Nigerian footballer
Sunday Ingbede (born 1998), Nigerian footballer
Sunday Patrick Okoro (born 1986), Nigerian footballer
Sunday Oliseh (born 1974), Nigerian footballer
Sunday Rotimi (born 1980), Nigerian footballer
Sunday Uti (born 1962), Nigerian sprinter

Other
Sunday Adelaja (born 1967), Nigerian pastor
Sunday Afolabi
Sunday Jack Akpan (born 1940), Nigerian sculptor
Sunday Akin Dare (born 1966), Nigerian journalist
Sunday Ehindero, Nigerian police officer
Sunday Muse, Canadian actress
Sunday Omobolanle (born 1954), Nigerian actor and filmmaker
Sunday Omony, Ugandan-Canadian model and activist
Sunday Popoola (born 1955), Nigerian pastor
Sunday Reed (1905–1981), Australian art collector and patron
Sunday Wilshin (1905–1991), British actress